Fogo Creole is the name given to the variant of Cape Verdean Creole spoken mainly in the Fogo of Cape Verde. It has around 50,000 speakers or nearly 5% of Cape Verdean Creole speakers including the diaspora's second language speakers. It belongs to the Sotavento Creoles branch. The rankings of this form of Cape Verdean Creole is fourth after Santo Antão and ahead of Sal.

Characteristics
Besides the main characteristics of Sotavento Creoles the Fogo Creole has also the following ones:
 The progressive aspect of the present is formed by putting stâ before the verbs: stâ + V.
Ex. coraçã  instead of coraçõ  “heart”, mã  instead of mõ  “hand”, razã  instead of razõ  “reason”.
 The sound  switches to  when it is at the end of syllables. Ex. ártu  instead of áltu  “tall”, curpâ  instead of culpâ  “to blame”, burcã  instead of vulcõ  “volcano”.
 The sound  disappears when it is at the end of words. Ex.: lugá’  instead of lugár  “place”, midjô’  instead of midjôr  “better”, mudjê’  instead of mudjêr  “woman”.
 The diphthongs (oral or nasal) are in general pronounced as vowels. Ex.: mã’  instead of mãi  “mother”, nã’  instead of nãu  “no”, pá’  instead of pái  “father”, rê’  instead of rêi  “king”, tchapê’  instead of tchapêu  “hat”.
 The pre-tonic sound  is velarized near labial or velar consonants. Ex.: badjâ “to dance” pronounced , cabêlu “hair” pronounced , catchô’ “dog” pronounced .

Vocabulary

Grammar

Phonology

Alphabet

References

External links
Short story collections in Fogo Creole by Elsie Clews Parsons
Tenporal Sta Ben: Un Stória di Nho Lobu  - children's short story in Fogo Creole and also in English

Fogo, Cape Verde